St Augustine's Church, Sookholme is a Grade I listed parish church in the Church of England in Sookholme near Warsop.

History

The church was built in the 12th century. It was restored in the 20th century.

References

Church of England church buildings in Nottinghamshire
Grade I listed churches in Nottinghamshire